Juan Guzmán (died 1605) was a Roman Catholic prelate who served as Patriarch of West Indies (1602–1605).

Biography
On 15 Nov 1602, Juan Guzmán was appointed during the papacy of Pope Clement VIII as Patriarch of West Indies.
He served as Patriarch of West Indies until his death in 1605.

References

External links and additional sources
 (for Chronology of Bishops) 
 (for Chronology of Bishops) 

17th-century Roman Catholic bishops in New Spain
Bishops appointed by Pope Clement VIII
1605 deaths